
Listed below are executive orders and presidential proclamations signed by United States President Gerald Ford. His executive orders and presidential proclamations are also listed on WikiSource.

Executive orders

1974

1975

1976

1977

References

 
United States federal policy
Executive orders of Gerald Ford
Gerald Ford-related lists